William Page may refer to:

William Page, 16th-century publisher who lost his hand as punishment for publishing a pamphlet by John Stubbs 
William Page (painter) (1811–1885), American painter
William Page (cricketer) (1847–1904), English cricketer
William Page (politician) (1848–1925), Australian politician
William Davidge Page (died 1939), British geologist and creator and editor of Page's Weekly
William Main Page (1869–1940), British lawyer and esperantist
William Nelson Page (1854–1932), American engineer
William Hamilton Page (1829–1909), American type designer
William Page (historian) (1861–1934), English historian and editor of the Victoria County History
William Tyler Page (1868–1942), American, author of The American's Creed
William W. Page (1836–1897), Oregon Supreme Court justice
William Page (MP) (died after 1584), English politician
Will Page, economist
William Page, a character in the 1949 film Abandoned
Bill Page (born 1925), American reed player, bandleader and entrepreneur